Jean-Philippe Blondel (born October 16, 1964) is a French novelist and high school English teacher. He was born in Troyes, about 200 km southwest of Paris, France.

Biography 
Blondel has taught at Lycée Edouard Herriot, a high school located in Sainte-Savine near his hometown of Troyes, since the 1990s.  Blondel is not only a French author of young-adult and realistic fiction novels but also an English teacher. His most popular work, The 6:41 to Paris, has reached worldwide popularity and has been translated into ten languages. This widespread interest in his novels has led to opportunities for Blondel to travel abroad.

Works in English 
 2010: A Place to Live .
 2013: The 6:41 to Paris, translated by Alison Anderson in 2015  
 2017: A Very French Christmas: The Greatest French Holiday Stories of All Time (Very Christmas), collaborative 
 2019: Exposed,  translated by Alison Anderson.

Works in French 

2003 : Accès direct à la plage, published by Delphine Montalant 
 2003 : 1979, published by Delphine Montalant 
 2004 : Juke-box (novel), edited by Robert Laffont 
 2005 : Un minuscule inventaire, edited by Robert Laffont 
 2006 : Passage du gué, edited by Robert Laffont 
 2007 : This is not a love song, edited by Robert Laffont 
 2007 : Un endroit pour vivre, edited by Actes Sud Junior 
 2009 : À contretemps, edited by Robert Laffont, Pocket in 2010 
 2009 : Au rebond, edited by Actes Sud Junior 
 2010 : Le Baby-sitter (book), edited by Buchet-Chastel 
 2010 : Blog, edited by Actes Sud Junior 
 2010 : Qui vive? (a work about the photos of Florence Lebert), edited by Thierry Magnier 
 2011 : G229, edited/published by Buchet/Chastel 
 2011 : (Re)play!, edited by Actes Sud Junior 
 2011 : Et rester vivant, edited/published by Buchet/Chastel 
 2011 : Brise-Glace, edited/published by Actes Sud Junior 
 2013 : 6h41, edited/published by Buchet/Chastel 
 2013 : Double jeu, edited/published by Actes Sud Junior 
 2014 : Un hiver à Paris, edited/published by Buchet/Chastel 
 2015 : La Coloc, edited/published by Actes Sud Junior
 2016 : Mariages de saison, edited/published by Buchet/Chastel
 2017 : Le Groupe, edited/published by Actes Sud Junior 
 2018 : La Mise à nu, edited/published by Buchet/Chastel

Awards 
2005:  Marie-Claire-Blais Quebec-France Literary Prize for Accès Direct à la Plage

2007: Biblioblog Award for Passage du Gué

2008: Charles-Exbrayat Award for This is not a Love Song

2011: Amerigo Vespucci Youth Prize for Qui Vive?

2011: Feminine Virgin-Version Award for G-229

2013: Middle and High School Students of Charante Award for Brise Glace

2016: You Love to Read Award from Middle and High School Students of Mayenne for La Coloc

References 

1964 births
Living people
21st-century French novelists